The Michigan Wolverines baseball program is a college baseball team that represents the University of Michigan in the Big Ten Conference of the National Collegiate Athletic Association. The team has had nineteen head coaches since organized baseball began in 1891. The current head coach is Tracy Smith who was hired in 2022.

In those seasons, ten coaches have won conference championships with the Wolverines, four coaches have won conference tournament championships, and two coaches have won national championships: Ray Fisher and Don Lund. Fisher is the all-time leader in games coached (940), wins (636) and years coached (38). Bud Middaugh is the all-time leader in postseason appearances (9) and wins (25). Sport McAllister is the overall leader in winning percentage, while Chris Harrison has the lowest winning percentage.

Key

Coaches

Notes

References

Lists of college baseball head coaches in the United States

Michigan Wolverines baseball coaches